Al-Ḥasan ibn Muḥammad ibn al-Ḥanafīyya (Arabic: الحسن بن محمد بن الحنفية) (died 718 CE/100 AH) was one of the Salaf and a narrator of hadith.

He was the son of Muhammad ibn al-Hanafiyya and the brother of Abd Allah ibn Muhammad ibn al-Hanafiyya.

Among the Isnad he is included in is the Hadith of prohibition of Mut'ah at Khaybar.

Legacy

Sunni view
 judged the two sons of Muhammad ibn al-Hanafiyya to be weak, arguing that one was a murijee, and the other to be a Shi'a.

Ibn Sa'd stated:

Family Tree

References

Taba‘ at-Tabi‘in hadith narrators
Year of birth missing
Place of birth missing
Place of death missing
719 deaths
7th-century Arabs
8th-century Arabs
Alvis